Karch is a name. Notable people with the name include:

 Karch Kiraly (born 1960), American volleyball player and coach
 Bob Karch (1894–1958), American football tackle in the National Football League
 Charles A. Karch (1875-1932), American Representative from Illinois
 Frederick J. Karch (1917-2009), United States Marine Corps officer 
 Karla Karch (born 1964), Canadian basketball player
 Oswald Karch (1917–2009), German racing driver
 Roy Karch (born 1946), American director of pornographic films